Aimone Alletti (born ) is an Italian male volleyball player. He is part of the Italy men's national volleyball team. On club level he plays for Power Volley.

References

External links
 profile at FIVB.org

1988 births
Living people
Italian men's volleyball players
Place of birth missing (living people)